Hồ is a Vietnamese word. It may refer to:

Hồ (surname), a Vietnamese surname
Hồ dynasty of Vietnam
Hồ, Bắc Ninh, a township and capital of Thuận Thành District